Abacetus batesi is a species of ground beetle in the subfamily Pterostichinae. It was described by Andrewes in 1926.

References

batesi
Beetles described in 1926